Bryan Douglas (born 27 May 1934) is an English former footballer who played as a winger. 

During his career, he played for Blackburn Rovers from 1954 to 1969, totalling 438 league appearances and 100 goals. He also earned 36 caps and scored 11 goals for England. He appeared in two World Cups, in 1958 and 1962, appearing in all of England's matches in the two tournaments.

In November 2012, the Darwen End stand of Ewood Park was renamed The Bryan Douglas Darwen End in honour of Douglas. He said of the tribute: "The first person to congratulate me was Ronnie's wife Val. He is at one end of the ground and I'm at the other end and long may that continue. We were great friends. They have put me at the right end as well. I was born just 400 yards away from the Darwen End. It is a really proud moment."

In February 2019 he was one of the first seven players to be inducted into the club's Hall of Fame.

References

External links
Blackburn Legend: Bryan Douglas

1934 births
Living people
English footballers
England international footballers
England under-23 international footballers
1958 FIFA World Cup players
1962 FIFA World Cup players
Blackburn Rovers F.C. players
Great Harwood F.C. players
English Football League players
Footballers from Blackburn
English Football League representative players
Association football wingers
FA Cup Final players